Tušice is a village and municipality in Michalovce District in the Kosice Region of eastern Slovakia.

History
In historical records the village was first mentioned in 1221 as Tuka. Since the 18th century variants of Tusa and Tussa has been recorded.

Geography
The village lies at an altitude of 107 metres and covers an area of 6.234 km2. The municipality has a population of about 700 people.

External links
http://www.statistics.sk/mosmis/eng/run.html

Villages and municipalities in Michalovce District